William Earl "Bootsy" Collins (born October 26, 1951) is an American bass guitarist and singer.

Rising to prominence with James Brown in the early 1970s, and later with Parliament-Funkadelic, Collins established himself as one of the leading names and innovators in funk with his driving basslines and humorous vocals.  He later formed his own P-Funk side project known as Bootsy's Rubber Band.   He was a frequent collaborator with other musicians from a variety of genres, including dance music (Deee-Lite's "Groove Is in the Heart"), electronic big beat (Fatboy Slim's "Weapon of Choice"), and alternative metal (Praxis), among others. He is a member of the Rock and Roll Hall of Fame, inducted in 1997 with 15 other members of Parliament-Funkadelic. In 2020, Rolling Stone magazine ranked Collins number 4 in its list of the 50 greatest bassists of all time.

Early life
Collins was born in Cincinnati, Ohio, on October 26, 1951. He said that his mother nicknamed him "Bootsy". "I asked her why," he explained to a journalist, "and she just said, 'Because you looked like a Bootsy.' I left it at that."

His brother Phelps "Catfish" Collins (1943–2010) was also a musician. He and Bootsy were once part of James Brown's backing band, The Pacemakers.

Collins has maintained a strong connection with Cincinnati.

Career

1960s–1970s
With his elder brother Phelps "Catfish" Collins, Frankie "Kash" Waddy, and Philippé Wynne, Collins formed a funk band, The Pacemakers, in 1968. In March 1970, after most of the members of James Brown's band quit over a pay dispute, The Pacemakers were hired as Brown's backing band and they became known as The J.B.'s. (They are often referred to as the "original" J.B.'s to distinguish them from later line-ups that went by the same name.) Although they worked for Brown for only 11 months, the original J.B.'s played on some of Brown's most intense funk recordings, including "Get Up (I Feel Like Being a) Sex Machine", "Bewildered (1970)",  "Super Bad", "Soul Power", "Talkin' Loud and Sayin' Nothing", and two instrumental singles, the much-sampled "The Grunt" and "These Are the J.B.'s". In regards to his tenure working for James Brown, Collins stated:

After parting ways with James Brown, Collins returned to Cincinnati and formed House Guests with his brother Phelps Collins, Rufus Allen, Clayton "Chicken" Gunnels, Frankie Waddy, Ronnie Greenaway and Robert McCullough. The House Guests released "What So Never the Dance" and another single on the House Guests label, as well as a third as The Sound of Vision on the House Guests label.

Next Collins moved to Detroit, Michigan, after Philippé Wynne suggested joining The Spinners, for whom Wynne had been singing.  However, following the advice of singer and future Parliament member Mallia Franklin, Collins made another choice. Franklin introduced both Collins brothers to George Clinton, and in 1972, both of the Collins brothers, along with Waddy, joined Funkadelic. Collins played bass on most of Funkadelic and Parliament albums through the early 1980s, garnering several songwriting credits as well.

In 1976 Collins, Catfish, Waddy, Joel Johnson (1953–2018), Gary "Mudbone" Cooper, Robert Johnson and The Horny Horns formed Bootsy's Rubber Band, a separate touring unit of Clinton's P-Funk collective. The group recorded five albums together, the first three of which are often considered to be among the quintessential P-Funk recordings. The group's 1978 album Bootsy? Player of the Year reached the top of the R&B album chart and spawned the #1 R&B single "Bootzilla".

Like Clinton, Collins took on several alter egos, from Casper the Funky Ghost to Bootzilla, "the world's only rhinestone rockstar monster of a doll", all as parts of the evolving character of an alien rock star who grew gradually more bizarre as time went on (see P-Funk mythology). He also adopted his trademark "space bass" around this time.

1980s–1990s
Collins released two 1980 albums, his first "solo" album Ultra Wave, and Sweat Band, on George Clinton's Uncle Jam label with a group billed as Bootsy's Sweat Band. He also was credited for co-producing the debut of P-Funk spinoff Zapp.

In 1984, he collaborated with Jerry Harrison of Talking Heads to produce "Five Minutes", a dance record sampled and edited from Ronald Reagan's infamous "We begin bombing in five minutes" speech.  The record was credited to "Bonzo goes to Washington" (also referenced in the 1985 Ramones song "Bonzo Goes to Bitburg", derived from Reagan's starring role as Professor Peter Boyd in the 1951 comedy film Bedtime for Bonzo).

After a nearly five-year hiatus, he had a comeback in 1988 (with some help from producer Bill Laswell).  What's Bootsy Doin'? flaunted a new sound that foreshadowed the 1990s, such as the dance floor smash "Party on Plastic". Laswell introduced Collins to Herbie Hancock, resulting in Perfect Machine (1988).  The techno-funk they recorded featured turntables for scratch appeal, and the smoothly-stylized vocals of Leroy "Sugarfoot" Bonner of chart-topping Ohio Players. These were the first of many collaborations between Laswell and Collins on many albums and projects, with the prolific producer using Bootsy mainly as a bassist but sometimes as a rhythm guitarist.

In 1988, Collins appeared as a guest artist to play bass on Keith Richards and The X-Pensive Winos album Talk is Cheap.

In 1989, Collins played bass on and produced several tracks of Malcolm McLaren's album Waltz Darling, credited to Malcolm McLaren and the Bootzilla Orchestra.

In 1990, Collins collaborated with Deee-Lite on their biggest hit "Groove Is in the Heart", and he contributed additional vocals. Although he also appeared in the music video playing the bass, the bassline in the song is actually a sample of a Herbie Hancock song called "Bring Down the Birds". Bootsy's Rubber Band became the de facto backing musicians for Deee-Lite during a world tour. The Rubber Band also recorded the EP Jungle Bass, their first recording in 11 years.

In 1992, he joined with guitarist Stevie Salas and drummer Buddy Miles to form the funk-metal fusion group Hardware.  The trio released one album, Third Eye Open, before disbanding. In the same year, Collins played bass guitar on the first Praxis album (produced by Laswell): Transmutation, alongside fellow Parliament-Funkadelic member Bernie Worrell, Bryan Mantia and Buckethead.

Bootsy's New Rubber Band formed in 1994, releasing Blasters of the Universe and also put forth the following live release "Keepin' dah Funk Alive 4-1995", recorded over two nights in Tokyo.

In 1995, Collins played in the remake of Jimi Hendrix's "If 6 Was 9," for Axiom Funk, a Funkadelic-like one-off supergroup produced by Bill Laswell and featuring (Funkadelic members) George Clinton, Bernie Worrell, Collins, (the guitar of the late) Eddie Hazel, Gary Shider and Laswell. The group released only one album (Funkcronomicon), and the song also appeared in the soundtrack of the movie Stealing Beauty.

Collins collaborated with Del McCoury, Doc Watson and Mac Wiseman to form the GrooveGrass Boyz.  They produced a fusion of bluegrass and funk.

2000s–present
Collins provided lead vocals for the Fatboy Slim song "Weapon of Choice" from his 2000 album Halfway Between the Gutter and the Stars.  Collins vocals quote the book Dune ("Walk without rhythm and you won't attract the worm").  The song won multiple MTV Video Music Awards and a Grammy Award for Best Music Video.

In 2004 Collins contributed to Christian rap artist TobyMac's Welcome to Diverse City album, collaborating on the “Diverse City” track, a song praised as one of the best on the album. The album won the 2005 Dove Award for Rap/Hip-Hop Album of the Year.

In October 2005, Collins co-wrote a song celebrating the resurgence of his hometown team, the Cincinnati Bengals of the National Football League called "Fear Da Tiger" which features "raps" written and performed by several Bengals players, including defensive end Duane Clemons, offensive tackle Stacy Andrews, and center Ben Wilkerson.  An edited version of the song was made into a music video which features cameos by many other Bengals players. Collins appeared with Little Richard, Bernie Worrell, and other notable musicians as the band playing with Hank Williams, Jr. for the Monday Night Football opening during for the 2006 season. Collins was the only all star to return with Williams for the 2007 season.

He also sings "Marshal Law", the theme song of the Cincinnati Marshals indoor football team and debuted the song in 2006 at half time of the April 29 Marshals home game against the West Palm Beach Phantoms.

In 2006, ABC Entertainment/A Charly Films Release released a DVD and CD from Collins and the New Rubber Band's concert at the 1998 North Sea Jazz Festival. Soon after the release, Collins split from long-time friend and guitarist Odhran "The Bodhran" Rameriz, citing creative differences as the reason.

Later that same year, Collins released the holiday album Christmas Is 4 Ever. This represents the first Christmas-themed album made by a member of the P-Funk musical collective. The album features re-workings of Christmas standards as well as original compositions.

In April 2007, Collins announced plans to open Bootsy's, a restaurant/club with Cincinnati area restaurateur Jeff Ruby.  The venue operated from 2008 to 2010. It featured live musical acts, a museum dedicated to Collins's musical career and Spanish, Central and South American cuisine.

In June 2007, Collins, along with Catfish Collins, Clyde Stubblefield, John "Jabo" Starks, and Bernie Worrell, participated in the recording of the soundtrack for the movie Superbad.  In December of that year they (without Worrell) went on to perform the first tribute concert remembering James Brown.

In July 2007, Collins also told Billboard magazine that he was working on a project named Science Faxtion and an album called Living on Another Frequency in which he serves as bassist and co-producer along with his lead vocalist Greg Hampton. The band also features guitarist Buckethead and drummer Brain. The album was released in November 2008.

Collins promoted Rock the Vote for its 2008 campaign together with Buckethead.

Collins portrayed a radio DJ in the 2013 video game, Grand Theft Auto V, in which several of his own songs were featured.

Collins has also collaborated extensively with Bill Laswell, Buckethead, and also frequently collaborated with fellow bassist Victor Wooten.

On December 14, 2018, Collins played a show with Detroit-based funk artist GRiZ, and also collaborated on a new song with GRiZ.

In January 2019, Collins announced on Facebook that he would be retiring from live performances for health reasons:

He wrote that he would be releasing a new album this year, and that he would continue to work in the studio and mentor young musicians.

On February 25, 2021, it was announced that Collins would be making an appearance as the "special guest host" of An Evening With Silk Sonic, the first studio album from Silk Sonic, a collaboration between Bruno Mars and Anderson .Paak. He was the one who came up with the band's name (much like he did with Babyface), and acts as the album's narrator, "threading" the songs together.

On July 7, 2022, Collins served as emcee for the opening ceremony for the 2022 World Games in Birmingham, Alabama.

Basses
Collins has owned many basses, several of which are custom made. His original Space Bass and its first replacement were made in Warren, Michigan by Larry Pless of Gus Zoppi's music store. The first Space Bass had a mahogany body and maple neck, white finish, and mirror pick guard. This is the Space Bass on the cover of 1976 album  Stretchin' Out in Bootsy's Rubber Band. Collins's original Space Bass guitar was stolen, but it was later recovered at a Cincinnati pawn shop and returned to Collins.

Another Collins signature instrument is a custom-built star-shaped bass guitar he also calls the Space Bass, built for him by Manuel "Manny" Salvador of GuitarCraft in 1998. In 2006 Collins made an agreement with Traben to make a signature Collins model bass, the Bootzilla. During the 2010 NAMM Show, Collins's new signature bass was released by Warwick, a customized Infinity Bass called "Bootsy Collins Black Star Signature Bass" or "Bootsy Collins Orange Star Signature Bass", depending on the color of the stars on it.

Funk University
In July 2010, Collins, in partnership with former child actor Cory Danziger, launched Funk University ("Funk U"), an online-only bass guitar school in which he also serves as curator and lead professor. Funk University offers an intense curriculum tailored for intermediate to advanced bass players as well as anyone interested in a deeper understanding of funk. The curriculum is based on bass theory, history of funk, and Collins's own musical history given by Collins himself, augmented by lessons and exercises in bass and rhythm from guest bassist professors such as Les Claypool, Meshell Ndegeocello, John B (Williams) and Victor Wooten. As of 2021, Funk University is now defunct.

Legacy
He has been mentioned in the song "Genius of Love" by Tom Tom Club in the line "Clinton's musicians such as Bootsy Collins raise expectation to a new intention", while "Got more bass than Bootsy Collins" is a line in the song "Rumble in the Jungle" by the Fugees. His influence in popular culture is seen in that he has been referenced by a number of television series. In The Fresh Prince of Bel-Air episode "Sooooooul Train", Geoffrey sneaks into the Soul Train tapings posing as Collins, while in The Mighty Boosh episode "The Legend of Old Gregg" an alien creature named 'The Funk' lands on Collins's house, giving him his ability to play the bass guitar "like some kinda delirious funky priest", as well as the ability to see around corners.

Red Hot Chili Peppers bassist Flea, who cited Collins as one of his primary influences, appeared in unmistakably Collins style clothing in the video for RHCP's "Dani California", and Collins's "What's a Telephone Bill?" was sampled for 2Pac's "Str8 Ballin'" track from his Thug Life: Volume 1 album. Les Claypool has also cited Collins as a musical influence.

In 2004 Collins was featured on the cover of "The Joker" on the Fatboy Slim album Palookaville. Collins served as Heineken's Amsterjam 2005 curator and master of ceremonies on Randall's Island, New York. On January 26, 2007, Collins gave the commencement address at the graduation ceremony at The Art Institute of Ohio - Cincinnati.

Awards and achievements
Collins appeared with Toots & the Maytals on the album True Love that won the Grammy Award for Best Reggae Album in 2005.

In October 2010, he was awarded a Lifetime Achievement Award by Bass Player magazine at the Key Club in Los Angeles. Collins was inducted in 2016 into the National Rhythm & Blues Hall of Fame.

Personal life
In March 2011, Collins and his wife visited Franklin L. Williams M.S #7's Little Kids Rock program, donated a bass, gave the children a bass lesson, and rapped with them while they played the blues. He is now an honorary board member of the organization. Collins is an honorary member of Phi Beta Sigma fraternity.

In an April 2011 interview with The Guardian, Collins stated that, at one point in his life, he took LSD every day for over two years.

Discography

 Ultra Wave (1980)
 The One Giveth, the Count Taketh Away (1982)
 What's Bootsy Doin'? (1988)
 Fresh Outta 'P' University (1997)
 Play with Bootsy (2002)
 Christmas Is 4 Ever (2006)
 The Official BootLeggedBootsyCD (2009)
 Tha Funk Capital of the World (2011)
 World Wide Funk (2017)
 The Power of the One (2020)
 Nobody's Perfect Experience (2021)

Filmography
In 2005, Collins appeared with Madonna, Iggy Pop, Little Richard, and The Roots' Questlove, in an American TV commercial for the Motorola ROKR phone.

Collins was featured in the 2002 film Standing in the Shadows of Motown.

Collins voiced the character Boötes Belinda in the Loonatics Unleashed episode "The Music Villain".

In 2009, Collins appeared in the Everybody Hates Chris episode "Everybody Hates Tasha".

Collins played an alien version of himself in the R-rated Williams Street spring break special Freaknik: The Musical on Adult Swim in March 2010.

On April 15, 2011, he appeared on Later... with Jools Holland, performing a memorable snippet of funk with Jools.

In the fall of 2011, Collins began being featured in a TV commercial for Old Navy in which he is making "boots" made by Bootsy to be sold at Old Navy.

He was also featured on an episode of Yo Gabba Gabba! on Nick Jr.

Collins guest starred as himself at the end of "Mid-Season Finale", an episode of The Patrick Star Show, a spin-off of Nickelodeon's SpongeBob SquarePants, in 2022.

Collins is the voice of Jimi Hendrix in the 2010 documentary, Jimi Hendrix: Voodoo Child, which is based on Hendrix's own words from letters, interviews and other printed materials.

Tour
In June 2011, Collins played the 10th Annual Bonnaroo Music and Arts Festival in Manchester, Tennessee.

References

External links 

Bootsy's Funk University
[ Bootsy bio on Allmusic]
Collins Looks To Future with Science Faction, Billboard, 2007.
Rob Fitzpatrick, Bootsy Collins: 'The freak show never ended', The Guardian, April 14, 2011.
Bootsy Collins RBMA lecture
 CincyMusic Profile

1951 births
Living people
American funk bass guitarists
American male bass guitarists
American funk drummers
American rhythm and blues bass guitarists
American soul musicians
Musicians from Cincinnati
American rhythm and blues singer-songwriters
American funk singers
American soul singers
African-American male singer-songwriters
P-Funk members
The J.B.'s members
Grammy Award winners
Warner Records artists
Ace Records (United States) artists
Columbia Records artists
Guitarists from Ohio
American male guitarists
20th-century American drummers
American male drummers
20th-century American guitarists
Praxis (band) members
African-American guitarists
20th-century African-American male singers
21st-century African-American male singers
Singer-songwriters from Ohio